Jamie Daniel Mascoll (born 15 March 1997) is an English professional footballer who plays as a defender or midfielder for Isthmian League Premier division team Hornchurch.

Career
Mascoll was born in Catford, London and started his career with local side Dulwich Hamlet, graduating from the club's Aspire Academy. He made his first team debut for the club on 7 October 2014, when he was substituted on in the 1–0 win over Thamesmead Town in the London Senior Cup. He went on to make another two cup appearances during the 2014–15 season. He made eight appearances for Dulwich at the start of the 2015–16 season before he joined Isthmian League Division One North side Phoenix Sports on loan in December 2015. He went on to be a key player for the club, making a total of seven starts during the loan spell. On 6 February 2016 he joined Isthmian League Division One North side Cray Wanderers on loan instead of returning to Champion Hill. At the start of the 2016–17 season in August, signed for fellow Isthmian League Premier Division rivals Grays Athletic on loan. He went on to make thirty appearances in all competitions for Grays before returning to Dulwich in February 2017, where he played in a number of games in the climax of the season.

On 21 August 2017 he signed for EFL League One side Charlton Athletic on a one-year contract following a successful trial and was placed into the under-23 squad. He had previously had a trial at Charlton as an under-16 player but was unsuccessful. He made his professional debut on 1 November 2017 in the 3–2 win over Fulham U23 in the EFL Trophy. He scored his first professional goal in an EFL Trophy tie against AFC Wimbledon on 4 September 2018. On 21 February 2019, Mascoll re-joined Dulwich Hamlet on an initial one-month loan.

Mascoll signed for Wycombe Wanderers on 23 July 2019. After making eight senior appearances that season, he was released.

On 24 August 2020, he joined Bolton Wanderers on a one-year deal. His debut came on 19 September when he came off the bench in the 81st minute, replacing Nathan Delfouneso in a 2–0 defeat to Colchester United. His first goal came on 17 November as he scored Bolton's third goal in a 3–2 win against Newcastle United U21 in the EFL Trophy.

On 24 February 2021, he joined League of Ireland Premier Division side Waterford on loan, becoming one of Everton legend Kevin Sheedy's first signings as manager of the club. He made his debut for the club in the opening game of the season on 19 March 2021 as his side lost 1–0 away to newly promoted side Drogheda United. On 19 May 2021, Bolton announced he would be released at the end of his contract. On 25 May 2021, he scored his first goal for Waterford, opening the scoring against Finn Harps at the RSC.

On 9 November 2021, Mascoll signed for National League side Wealdstone. He made his debut four days later, in a 1–0 victory over rivals Barnet. Mascoll scored his first Wealdstone goal on 29 January 2022, finding the net from 30 yards in a 2–1 defeat to Grimsby Town.

On 17 May 2022, Mascoll was one of six players released by Wealdstone following the end of the 2021-22 season.

On 7 October 2022, Lewes announced that they had signed Mascoll.

On 4 March 2023, Mascoll signed for Isthmian League Premier division side Hornchurch.

Career statistics

Honours
Wycombe Wanderers
EFL League One Play-off (promotion) 2019–20 EFL League One

Bolton Wanderers
EFL League Two third-place (promotion): 2020–21

References

External links

1997 births
Living people
Footballers from Catford
English footballers
Association football midfielders
Dulwich Hamlet F.C. players
Phoenix Sports F.C. players
Cray Wanderers F.C. players
Grays Athletic F.C. players
Charlton Athletic F.C. players
Wycombe Wanderers F.C. players
Bolton Wanderers F.C. players
Waterford F.C. players
Wealdstone F.C. players
Isthmian League players
English Football League players
League of Ireland players
Expatriate association footballers in the Republic of Ireland